Two cities of ancient Italy were named Bovianum, both in Samnium:

 Bojano (Bovianum Undecumanorum)
 Bovianum Vetus, a colonia of uncertain location, sometimes (erroneously, according to the Oxford Classical Dictionary), identified with Pietrabbondante